Gema or GEMA may refer to:

Organizations
 GEMA (German organization), a performance rights organisation in Germany
 Gema Records (Gema), a Cuban record label founded by Álvarez Guedes and others in 1957 
 Gas and Electricity Markets Authority (GEMA) in the United Kingdom
 Gikuyu, Embu, and Meru Association (GEMA), a Kenyan organisation
 Gemmological Association of Great Britain (Gem-A), a gemmology education and qualifications body based in the UK
 Georgia Emergency Management Agency (GEMA)

Companies
 Global Engine Manufacturing Alliance (GEMA), an engine-manufacturing joint venture between Chrysler, Hyundai Motors and Mitsubishi Motors
  (GEMA), which produced radar equipment for the Kriegsmarine during World War II

Others
 Gema (given name)
 Gema, Zamora, a town in Spain
 Gema, a Di Gi Charat character
 Gema, a general purpose macro processor

See also
Gemma (disambiguation)